Igor Leonidovich Khudolei (also Khudoley) (7, July 1940 - 2001) was a Russian pianist, composer and Honored Artist of Russia.

He graduated from the Moscow Conservatory and post-graduate courses under Professor Ya. Flier (piano). Igor Khudolei attended the classes of Professor S.Balasanyan (composition). Khudolei is a laureate of several competitions - International Pianists (Lisbon, 1946), All-Union Pianists Competition (Kiev, 1970), and All-Union Composers Competition (Moscow, 1963).

Compositions

Concert Suite for Piano after Mussorgsky's Opera "Boris Godunov"
Transcription for piano of Night on Bald Mountain, by Modest Mussorgsky

Discography 
M.Mussorgsky:Pictures at an Exhibition,Igor Khudolei:Boris Godunov, suit;Igor Khudolei, piano;(Melodiya Record Company, USSR, 1990).
Schnittke: Symphony No. 4; Three Sacred Hymns; Iarslav Zdorov, countertenor; Dmitri Pianov, tenor; Igor Khudolei, piano; Evgeniya Khlynova, celesta; Elena Adamovich, harpsichord; Russian State Symphonic Cappella and Russian State Symphony Orchestra conducted by Valery Polyansky (Chandos Records Ltd., 1996).

References

M.Mussorgsky:Pictures at an Exhibition,Igor Khudolei:Boris Godunov,suit;Igor Khudolei, piano;(Melodiya Record Company, USSR, 1990).

Russian musicians
1940 births
2001 deaths